Lake Topozero is a large freshwater lake in the Republic of Karelia, northwestern part of Russia. It is 75.3 km long and 30.3 km wide. Maximum depth is about 50 m. There are more than 100 islands on the lake. Topozero is used for fishery and timber rafting. Its primary outflow is the Kovda, which is also called Sofyanga in its first stretch from Lake Topozero to Lake Pyaozero. The Kovda flows to the White Sea.

References

Lakes of the Republic of Karelia
LTopozero